Constantino de Oliveira Junior (born 1968) is a Brazilian businessman. He joined the career with his father Nene Constantino, a bus magnate.  He was the chairman of Gol Transportes Aéreos and was previously the CEO of the airline from 2001 until 2012.

Biography
Oliveira was born in Patrocínio, Brazil and graduated from the University of California, Berkeley in 1990. He launched the country's first successful low-cost airline, GOL. The company went public in June 2004 and under de Oliveira's leadership as chief executive, it grew to be one of the nation's three largest airlines (along with Azul and LATAM). He shares the controlling stake in GOL with his three brothers - Henrique Constantino, Joaquim Constantino Neto, and Ricardo Constantino. All the brothers sit on GOL's board. For unclear reasons, his first name, Constantino, is his brothers' last name."  He also studied Business Administration at the Universidade do Distrito Federal and attended the Executive Program on Corporate Management for Brazil conducted by the Association for Overseas Technical Scholar. He was also the CEO of Gol from 2001 until 2012 when Paulo Kakinoff took over as the CEO.

Auto racing
He is also a part-time racing car driver. He competed in Porsche GT3 Cup Brasil.

References

Brazilian chief executives
Gol Transportes Aéreos
University of California, Berkeley alumni
1968 births
Living people
Brazilian racing drivers